Rockville is a village in the town of Hopkinton, Washington County, Rhode Island, United States. The zip code is 02873.

Notable people
Burrows Burdick, Wisconsin legislator, was born in Rockville.

Notable Locations
Yawgoog Scout Reservation, one of the oldest scout camps in operation

References

Villages in Washington County, Rhode Island
Villages in Rhode Island